Eucalyptus limitaris is a species of tree or mallee that is endemic to north-west Australia. It has rough, flaky or fibrous bark on the trunk and branches, lance-shaped to curved adult leaves, flower buds in groups of seven on a branching peduncle and conical to barrel-shaped or cup-shaped fruit.

Description
It has rough, fibrous to flaky, deeply fissured, greyish to brownish bark from the trunk to the thinnest branches.

Taxonomy and naming
Eucalyptus limitaris was first formally described in 2000 by Lawrie Johnson and Ken Hill near the Mary River. The description was published in the journal Telopea. The botanical name (limitaris) is from the Latin limes, limitis meaning "a border" or "a boundary", referring to the distribution of the species.

Distribution and habitat
This eucalypt grows in open savanna shrubland, often near ephemeral creeks near the border between Western Australia and the Northern Territory, in the area between Halls Creek, Fitzroy Crossing and around Top Springs.

Conservation status
Eucalyptus limitaris is classified as "not threatened" in Western Australia by the Western Australian Government Department of Parks and Wildlife.

See also

List of Eucalyptus species

References

Eucalypts of Western Australia
Trees of Australia
limitaris
Myrtales of Australia
Plants described in 2000
Taxa named by Lawrence Alexander Sidney Johnson
Taxa named by Ken Hill (botanist)